The Visayan leopard cat is a Sunda leopard cat (Prionailurus javanensis sumatranus) population in the Philippine Islands of Negros, Cebu and Panay.

Taxonomy 
Prionailurus bengalensis rabori was proposed in 1997 by anthropologist Colin Groves on the basis of morphological analysis of a skin and skull. He considered it a leopard cat subspecies.

Results of phylogeographic research show that Sunda leopard cats from Borneo, Sumatra and the Philippine islands are genetically very similar. The Sunda leopard cat probably reached the Philippine islands from Borneo after the eruption of Toba Volcano during the late Pleistocene glaciation. It has therefore been subsumed to P. javanensis sumatranus in 2017.

Characteristics 
The fur of the Visayan leopard cat is dark ochre to buffy fawn with large and dark spots. Its skull is a little narrower than of Sumatran leopard cat and Bornean leopard cat.

Distribution and habitat 
The Visayan leopard cat is endemic to the Philippine islands of Panay and Negros where it inhabits remnant forest fragments. In Cebu, it has also been recorded in sugarcane farms. It is probably locally extinct or close to extinction on the islands of Cebu and Masbate. Panay and Negros islands have lost 90%–95 % of their natural habitat.

In captivity 
Five Visayan leopard cats are housed at the Mariit Wildlife and Conservation Park at the West Visayas State University campus in Lambunao, Iloilo. Two of these were rescued from Pontevedra, Capiz, and have been named Ponte and Vedra.

References 

Prionailurus
Mammals described in 1997
Mammals of the Philippines
Endemic fauna of the Philippines
Fauna of the Visayas
Fauna of Panay
Fauna of Negros Island
Fauna of Cebu
Subspecies